Chlumec is a town in Ústí nad Labem District in the Ústí nad Labem Region of the Czech Republic. It has about 4,200 inhabitants.

Administrative parts
Villages of Český Újezd, Hrbovice, Stradov, Střížovice and Žandov are administrative parts of Trmice. Český Újezd, Hrbovice and Střížovice form an exclave of the municipal territory.

Geography
There are two significant ponds in the territory, Nový and Zámecký.

The towns extends into three geomorphological regions. Most of the municipal territory lies in the eastern tip of the Most Basin lowlands, the northern part lies in the Ore Mountains, and villages of Český Újezd and Střížovice lie on the slopes of the Central Bohemian Uplands.

History
The first written mention of Chlumec is in a deed of Boleslaus II from 993, where the obligation of Chlumec to pay tithe to the newly established Břevnov Monastery is mentioned. In 1521, Chlumec became a town.

The Battle of Chlumec was fought on 18 February 1126 in the vicinity of the village, the culmination of a 12th-century war of succession in the Duchy of Bohemia.

After the great Battle of Dresden (26–27 August 1813), the Battle of Kulm took place here on 29–30 August, between the French Empire under Dominique Vandamme and an allied army of Austrians, Prussians, and Russians. The French were defeated and Vandamme surrendered with his army of 10,000 men. The heights above Chlumec were the site of the Second Battle of Kulm, 17 September 1813.

Demographics

Transport
The D8 motorway runs next to the town.

Notable people
Johann Georg Urbansky (1675–1738), Bohemian-German sculptor

References

External links

Populated places in Ústí nad Labem District
Cities and towns in the Czech Republic